Nicholas or Nick Wright may refer to:

Sports
 Nicholas Wright (cricketer, born 1960), English cricketer
 Nicholas Wright (cricketer, born 1901) (1901–1974), English cricketer
 Nick Wright (footballer, born 1975), English footballer
 Nick Wright (footballer, born 1987), English footballer
 Nick Wright (sportscaster) (born 1984), sports radio and television personality

Other people
 Nicholas Wright (academic) (born 1945), English academic
 Nicholas Wright (playwright) (born 1940), British dramatist
 Nicholas L. Wright (born 1981), archaeologist and numismatist
 Nicolas Wright (born 1982), Canadian actor
 Nick Wright (politician) (born 1982), Canadian politician and lawyer
 Nick Wright (Royal Navy officer) (born 1949), private secretary to the Princess Royal
 N. T. Wright (born 1948), British New Testament scholar and Anglican bishop

See also
 Phoenix Wright, nicknamed "Nick", fictional character in the game Phoenix Wright: Ace Attorney